Pepitone is an Italian surname. Notable people with the surname include:

Joe Pepitone (1940–2023), American baseball player
Eddie Pepitone (born 1958), American actor and comedian

Italian-language surnames